Diaz is a city in Jackson County, Arkansas, United States. The population was 1,318 at the 2010 census.

Geography
Diaz is located at  (35.644423, -91.261294).

Demographics

2020 census

As of the 2020 United States census, there were 1,224 people, 505 households, and 374 families residing in the city.

2000 census
As of the census of 2000, there were 1,284 people, 465 households, and 365 families residing in the city. The racial makeup of the city was 69.63% White, 28.35% Black or African American, 0.47% Native American, 0.55% from other races, and 1.01% from two or more races.  1.17% of the population were Hispanic or Latino of any race.

There were 465 households, out of which 38.7% had children under the age of 18 living with them, 55.5% were married couples living together, 18.1% had a female householder with no husband present, and 21.3% were non-families. 18.5% of all households were made up of individuals, and 6.2% had someone living alone who was 65 years of age or older.  The average household size was 2.76 and the average family size was 3.15.

In the city, the population was spread out, with 30.5% under the age of 18, 8.6% from 18 to 24, 30.5% from 25 to 44, 20.9% from 45 to 64, and 9.5% who were 65 years of age or older.  The median age was 33 years. For every 100 females, there were 91.4 males.  For every 100 females age 18 and over, there were 87.4 males.

The median income for a household in the city was $34,792, and the median income for a family was $38,646. Males had a median income of $31,339 versus $19,853 for females. The per capita income for the city was $15,867.  About 11.7% of families and 14.6% of the population were below the poverty line, including 20.5% of those under age 18 and 17.1% of those age 65 or over.

Education
Diaz is divided between the Newport School District and the Jackson County School District.

The portion of what is now the Diaz CDP that is in the Jackson County district was formerly in the Tuckerman School District. On July 1, 1993 that district merged into the Jackson County district.

References

Cities in Arkansas
Cities in Jackson County, Arkansas